Pamban is a town in the Rameswaram taluk of Ramanathapuram district, Tamil Nadu. It is at the west edge of Pamban Island and is a popular fishing port. The town gives its name to the whole island. Pamban railway station is the first station on the island for pilgrims travelling to Rameswaram.

Demographics 
As per the 2011 census, Pamban had a population of 37819 with 19163 males and 18656 females. The sex ratio was  974 and the literacy rate, 85.16%

Climate 
Pamban has a tropical savanna climate (Köppen climate classification As) with hot summers and cool winters. Unlike most locations in India with this climate, most rainfall occurs in autumn and winter, with the heaviest rain falling from October to December, and very little rain in the summer months of June to August.

Transport

Pamban Bridge is a railway bridge which connects the town of Mandapam in mainland India with Pamban Island, and Rameswaram. Opened on 24 February 1914, it was India's first sea bridge, and was the longest sea bridge in India until the opening of the Bandra-Worli Sea Link in 2010. The rail bridge is, for the most part, a conventional bridge resting on concrete piers, but has a double-leaf bascule section midway, which can be raised to let ships and barges pass through. Until 1988, the Pamban bridge was the only surface transport that connected Tamil Nadu's island of Rameswaram to the mainland. In December 2018, the bascule of this bridge was damaged, which suspended transportation on the bridge for 3 months. Rail movement was again restored on 27 February 2019.

In 1988, a road bridge was also constructed parallel to the rail bridge. This road bridge is also known as Annai Indira Gandhi Road Bridge. The Annai Indira Gandhi Road Bridge connects the National Highway (NH 49) with the Rameswaram island. It stands on the Palk Strait and between the shores of Mandapam (a place on the Indian mainland)  and Pamban (one of the fishermen town in Rameswaram island). It was inaugurated by former Indian Prime Minister Rajiv Gandhi on 2 October 1988. This 2.345 km long bridge took close to 14 years to be completed.

The Pamban Lighthouse, along with 23 other lighthouses along the eastern, southern and western coast of the Indian peninsula, comes under the administration of the Chennai Lighthouse District, In accord with the Lighthouse Act of 1927 and the Lighthouse (Amendment) Act of 1985.

References

External links 
 Pamban Bridge, Ramanathapuram, official site 

Cities and towns in Ramanathapuram district